The cinema of Saudi Arabia is a fairly small industry that only produces a few feature films and documentaries every year.

With the exception of one IMAX theater in Khobar, there were no cinemas in Saudi Arabia from 1983 to 2018, although there was occasionally talk of opening movie theaters, and in 2008 conference rooms were rented to show the comedy Mennahi. Saudis wishing to watch films have done so via satellite, DVD, or video. Cinemas had been banned for 35 years until the first cinema in Saudi Arabia opened on 18 April 2018 in Riyadh. AMC Theatres plans to open up to 40 cinemas in some 15 Saudi cities over the following five years. The government hopes that by 2030, Saudi Arabia will already have more than 300 theaters with over 2,000 movie screens.

Keif al-Hal?, released in 2006, was billed as Saudi Arabia's first film; however, it was shot in the United Arab Emirates and the lead female was played by a Jordanian. The 2012 film Wadjda had an all-Saudi cast and was the first feature film shot entirely in Saudi Arabia. The film Barakah Meets Barakah by director Mahmoud Sabbagh was shot in Jeddah in 2015, premiered the 66th Berlin International Film Festival, making it the first feature film to participate in the festival. Sameera Aziz is the first Saudi filmmaker in famous Indian cinema Bollywood.

Cinema of Saudi Arabia, whether locally-produced or foreign-sourced, is subject to Saudi censorship.

Films
Keif al-Hal? triggered a debate on the country's stance on cinemas and films. The documentary short film directed by Abdullah Al-Eyaf called Cinema 500 km discussed the issue of banning movie theaters and the film forced the media to take up the issue and discuss it.  
Wadjda was selected as the Saudi Arabian entry for the Best Foreign Language Film at the 86th Academy Awards - the first time the country made a submission for the Oscars - but it was not nominated. It earned a nomination for Best Foreign Film at the 2014 BAFTA Awards.

Barakah Yoqabil Barakah was the first feature film from Saudi Arabia to participate in the Berlin International Film Festival; it won a jury award at the festival.

Movie theaters
In the 1970s, there were many movie theaters in Saudi Arabia and they were not considered un-Islamic, though they were seen as contrary to Arab cultural norms.

In the 1980s, there were some improvised movie halls in Saudi Arabia, most of which were in Jeddah and Mecca, where Egyptian, Indian, and Turkish films were screened without government intervention. However, all these halls were closed due to the growing objections of religious conservatives during the Islamic revival movement in the 1980s. As a political response to an increase in Islamist activism, including the 1979 seizure of the Grand Mosque in Mecca, the government closed all cinemas and theaters.

During the cinema ban, the only public theater in Saudi Arabia was a single IMAX cinema located in Khobar at the Sultan Bin Abdulaziz Science and Technology Center. The IMAX cinema, in operation since 2005, shows only educational films. The documentaries are mostly productions from the United States shown in Arabic, with English audio headphones available.

In November 2005, a 1,400-seat cinema opened at a hotel in Riyadh for a limited run. The cinema was open for women and children only and showed foreign cartoons dubbed in Arabic. Following the public screenings, the cinema ban was put into question as the demand for movie theaters in Saudi Arabia increased.

On 11 December 2017, the Saudi Arabian Minister of Culture and Information announced that public movie theaters would be allowed by 2018. The government hopes that by 2030, Saudi Arabia will already have more than 300 theaters with over 2,000 movie screens. The first public film screening was Black Panther beginning on 18 April 2018 for five days in a 620-seat cinema owned by AMC Theatres in Riyadh's King Abdullah Financial District which was originally intended to be a symphony hall. Avengers: Infinity War began screening in the kingdom on 26 April. In May 2018, it was announced that IMAX had signed a deal with VOX Cinemas to open at least four IMAX venues following the lifting of the cinema ban. At the time, it was also announced that VOX Cinemas intends to open 600 screens throughout Saudi Arabia over the next five years.

Video rental stores
Video rental stores started appearing in the 1980s and offered Arabic, Western, and Asian movies. By the late 1990s, the increasing number of free-to-air satellite TV channels led most video stores to close.

Saudi films
A small but growing number of films have been produced in Saudi Arabia with a Saudi cast. Notable Saudi films include:

 Shams Al-Ma'arif (2020)
 Barakah Meets Barakah (2016)
 Dhilal al Sammt (Shadow of Silence; 2004)
 Cinema 500 km (2006)
 Keif al-Hal? (2006)
 Women without Shadows (Nisaa Bil Thil; 2006)
 I Don' Wanna (2008)
 Shadow (2008)
 Three Men and a Woman (2008)
 According to Local Time (2008)
 Sunrise/Sunset (2008)
 Last Day (2008)
 Project (2008)
 Wadjda (2012)
  Roallem (2019)The Perfect Candidate (2019)Masameer: The Movie (2020)Films shot in Saudi Arabia
 Le Schiave Esistono Ancora (Italian; 1964)Exile Family Movie (Austrian; 2006)
 Le Grand Voyage (French; 2004) - partly filmed in Mecca
 Malcolm X (American; 1992) - the first non-documentary to be given permission to film in Mecca
 Wadjda (Saudi-German; 2012)
 Barakah Meets Barakah (Saudi; 2016)
 A Hologram for the King (English; 2016)The Perfect Candidate'' (Saudi; 2019)

Saudi directors
 Abdullah Al-Muheisen
 Abdulelah Alqurashi
 Mohammad Makki
 Abdullah Al-Eyaf
 Haifaa al-Mansour
 Yousef Linjawi
 Mohammad Aldhahri
 Mohammad Al Khalif
 Abdulmuhsin Almutairi
 Hussam Alhulwah
 Mohammed Alhamoud
 Abdulmohsen Al-Dhabaan
 Nawaf Almuhanna
 Mohammed Salman
 Mohammed Albash
 Mosa Althounian
 Mohana Abdullah
 Mahmoud Sabbagh
 Gigi Hozimah
 Abdulmuhsen Alquseer
 Sameera Aziz

Saudi actors
 Hisham Fageeh
 Ahd Kamel
 Fatima Al-Banawi
 Hind Mohammed
 Hisham Abdulrahman
 Abdullah Al-Sarhan
 Nasir Al-Gasabi
 Habib Al-Habib
 Yusof Al-Jarrah
 Mohammed Baksh
 Mushari Hilal
 Reem Abdullah
 Ahmed Khalil

See also
 Egyptian cinema

References

See also 

 Censorship in Saudi Arabia
 Cinema of the world
 Egyptian cinema
 Arab cinema
 Cinema of the Middle East